Dwight Lynn White (July 30, 1949 – June 6, 2008) was an American professional football player who was a defensive end for ten seasons with the Pittsburgh Steelers of the National Football League (NFL). He was a member of their the famed Steel Curtain defense.

Life and career
Born in Hampton, Virginia, White graduated from James Madison High School in Dallas, Texas and played college football at East Texas State University (since renamed Texas A&M University–Commerce) where he was teammates with future Super Bowl MVP Harvey Martin.

Pittsburgh Steelers
Nicknamed "Mad Dog", because of his intensity, White became a two-time Pro Bowl defensive end.  White spent much of the week leading up to Super Bowl IX in a hospital, suffering from pneumonia; he lost 20 pounds and was not expected to play in the game. However, he did play, and accounted for the only scoring in the first half when he sacked Fran Tarkenton in the end zone for a safety — the first points in Steelers' history in a championship game.  The Steelers defeated the Minnesota Vikings 16–6.

White finished his career with 46 quarterback sacks as recorded unofficially by the Steelers; sacks were not an official NFL defensive stat until 1982.

Steelers owner Dan Rooney called White "one of the greatest players to ever wear a Steelers uniform" and he was named to the Steelers All-Time team in 1982 and again in 2007.  He retired after the 1980 season and went on to become a stock broker.

Death
Dwight White died of complications that arose from an earlier surgery. A blood clot in his lung, the complication from back surgery, is the suspected cause of death. On February 1, 2010, his family filed a wrongful death suit against the University of Pittsburgh Medical Center and three doctors, claiming that his death had been caused by medical negligence.

Notes

 The Super Bowl An Official Retrospective, Ballantine Books, 2005.

External links
Stats from Pro Football Reference

1949 births
2008 deaths
Sportspeople from Hampton, Virginia
Texas A&M–Commerce Lions football players
American football defensive ends
African-American players of American football
Pittsburgh Steelers players
Players of American football from Virginia
American Conference Pro Bowl players
20th-century African-American sportspeople
21st-century African-American people